Zygaenosia basalis is a moth in the family Erebidae. It was described by Rothschild and Jordan in 1901, and is endemic to Papua New Guinea.

References

Nudariina
Moths described in 1901
Zygaenosia